Ashley is a town in Indiana located on the border of Smithfield Township, DeKalb County and Steuben Township, Steuben County. The population was 983 at the 2010 census.

History
Ashley was platted in 1892 when the Wabash Railroad was extended to that point. That year, a post office was established, and it is still currently in operation.

Geography
Ashley is located at  (41.52611000000000000000, -85.064672).

Demographics

2010 census
As of the 2010 census, there were 983 people, 378 households, and 255 families living in the town. The racial makeup of the town was 95.6% White, 0.2% African American, 0.5% Native American, 0.3% Asian, 1.6% from other races, and 1.7% from two or more races. Hispanic or Latino of any race were 3.4% of the population.

There were 378 households, of which 39.4% had children under the age of 18 living with them, 42.1% were married couples living together, 16.1% had a female householder with no husband present, 9.3% had a male householder with no wife present, and 32.5% were non-families. 27.8% of all households were made up of individuals, and 8.7% had someone living alone who was 65 years of age or older. The average household size was 2.60 and the average family size was 3.10.

The median age in the town was 34 years. 30.5% of residents were under the age of 18; 8.5% were between the ages of 18 and 24; 25% were from 25 to 44; 25.1% were from 45 to 64; and 10.8% were 65 years of age or older. The gender makeup of the town was 50.9% male and 49.1% female.

2000 census
As of the 2000 census, there were 1,010 people, 409 households and 254 families living in the town. The racial makeup of the town was 97.52% White, 0.40% African American, 0.10% Native American, 0.30% Asian, 0.20% Pacific Islander, 0.30% from other races, and 1.19% from two or more races. Hispanic or Latino of any race were 0.99% of the population.

There were 409 households, out of which 37.4% had children under the age of 18 living with them, 47.2% were married couples living together, 11.0% had a female householder with no husband present, and 37.7% were non-families. 31.8% of all households were made up of individuals, and 11.0% had someone living alone who was 65 years of age or older. The average household size was 2.47 and the average family size was 3.14.

In the town, the population was spread out, with 30.5% under the age of 18, 9.6% from 18 to 24, 33.5% from 25 to 44, 16.6% from 45 to 64, and 9.8% who were 65 years of age or older. The median age was 30 years. For every 100 females, there were 99.2 males. For every 100 females age 18 and over, there were 95.0 males.

The median income for a household in the town was $35,893, and the median income for a family was $42,841. Males had a median income of $32,833 versus $23,208 for females. The per capita income for the town was $14,922. About 10.2% of families and 12.8% of the population were below the poverty line, including 16.3% of those under age 18 and 15.0% of those age 65 or over.

References

External links

 

Towns in DeKalb County, Indiana
Towns in Steuben County, Indiana
Towns in Indiana
1892 establishments in Indiana
Populated places established in 1892